David Meir Blei is a professor in the Statistics and Computer Science departments at Columbia University. Prior to fall 2014 he was an associate professor in the Department of Computer Science at Princeton University. His work is primarily in machine learning.

Research
His research interests include topic models and he was one of the original developers of latent Dirichlet allocation, along with Andrew Ng and Michael I. Jordan. As of June 18, 2020, his publications have been cited 109,821 times, giving him an h-index of 97.

Honors and awards
Blei received the ACM Infosys Foundation Award in 2013. (This award is given to a computer scientist under the age of 45. It has since been renamed the ACM Prize in Computing.) He was named Fellow of ACM "For contributions to the theory and practice of probabilistic topic modeling and Bayesian machine learning" in 2015.

References

External links
Homepage
 Latent Dirichlet Allocation (PDF)
 Publications
 ACM-Infosys Foundation Award, 2013

Living people
Artificial intelligence researchers
Brown University alumni
University of California, Berkeley alumni
Columbia University faculty
Columbia School of Engineering and Applied Science faculty
Fellows of the Association for Computing Machinery
Recipients of the ACM Prize in Computing
Year of birth missing (living people)
Machine learning researchers